Kolari is a town in Finland. Kolari may also refer to:

 Kolari, Sweden, a small village in Sweden, very near the Finnish Kolari
 Kolari (island), Russia, in Leningrad Oblast, Russia
 Kolari (Smederevo), a village in Serbia
 Kolari, Kičevo, a village in the Republic of Macedonia 
 Kolari, Agra, a village in Uttar Pradesh, India
 Kolari, Kerala, a village in Kerala State, India
 Kolari (caste), an Indian caste